In Slovakia, there is a Hviezdoslav Square (Slovakian Hviezdoslavovo námestie) in the following towns:

 in Bratislava, see Hviezdoslavovo námestie (Bratislava)
 in Námestovo, see Hviezdoslavovo námestie (Námestovo)
 in Nové Zámky, see Hviezdoslavovo námestie (Nové Zámky)